"Victims" is a song by English band Culture Club, released as a single in 1983 and taken from the album Colour by Numbers. The song would become a major hit in several European countries.

The group's previous single "Karma Chameleon" had been a massive hit worldwide, but "Victims" would be released as a single in Europe, Australia, and Africa. The song peaked at #3 on the UK Singles Chart, #2 in Ireland, and #4 in Australia. The song was not released as a single in North America, South America, or Japan/Asia, where instead "Miss Me Blind" was released as a single, becoming a hit in those markets.

The orchestral overdub on this track was recorded in Studio 1 at CBS Recording Studios, London by the renowned recording engineer, Mike Ross-Trevor (assisted by Richard Hollywood) on Saturday 9 July 1983. The day earlier (on Friday 8 July), a new drum track was overdubbed by Jon Moss in Studio 1. However, this was later replaced by a new drum track for the final released version.

Its B-side was a song titled "Colour by Numbers", which is the title of the group's album to but not included on it. An instrumental version was also issued on the 12", renamed "Romance Revisited". Both songs are now available on the 2003 remastered version of Colour by Numbers.

An early demo version of the song was released re-titled "Shirley Temple Moment" on the Culture Club box set. The track is a candid glimpse of the relationships within the band as they argue viciously amongst one another between takes, before Boy George finally walks out. It is notable also for the different lyrics which appear in the first verse:

Lead singer Boy George re-recorded the song himself as a solo artist, as a folk arrangement with piano and an orchestra, in 2002. That version can be found on the Culture Club box set that was released the same year.

Charts

Weekly charts

Year-end charts

References

1983 singles
Culture Club songs
Music videos directed by Godley and Creme
1983 songs
Virgin Records singles
Song recordings produced by Steve Levine
Songs written by Boy George
Songs written by Roy Hay (musician)
Songs written by Mikey Craig
Songs written by Jon Moss
Pop ballads